David Gardiner may refer to:

 David Gardiner (footballer) (born 1957), Guatemalan footballer
 David Gardiner (politician) (1784–1844), state senator and father-in-law of U.S. President John Tyler
 David Gardiner (environmentalist) (born 1955), American environmental strategist
 David Gardiner (Home and Away), fictional Australian television character
 David Gardiner (1636–1689), first white child born in Connecticut, son of Lion Gardiner

See also
 David Gardner (disambiguation)